Hypostomus unae is a species of catfish in the family Loricariidae. It is native to South America, where it occurs in the Una River basin in the state of Bahia in Brazil. The species reaches 18.3 cm (7.2 inches) SL and is believed to be a facultative air-breather.

References 

Hypostominae
Fish described in 1878